Bullittsville is an unincorporated community in Boone County, Kentucky, United States.

A post office called Bullittsville was established in 1853, and remained in operation until 1918. The community has the name of Thomas Bullitt, a pioneer surveyor.

Notes

Unincorporated communities in Boone County, Kentucky
Unincorporated communities in Kentucky